The Cenacle (from the Latin , "dining room"), also known as the Upper Room (from the Koine Greek  and , both meaning "upper room"), is a room in Mount Zion in Jerusalem, just outside the Old City walls, traditionally held to be the site of the Last Supper, the final meal that, in the Gospel accounts, Jesus held with the apostles.

According to the Christian Bible, the Cenacle was a place in which the apostles continued to gather after the Last Supper, and it was also the site where the Holy Spirit alighted upon the eleven apostles on Pentecost.

The site is administered by the Israeli authorities, and is part of a building holding the so-called "David's Tomb" on its ground floor.

Etymology
"Cenacle" is a derivative of the Latin word , which means "I dine". Jerome used the Latin  for both Greek words in his Latin Vulgate translation.

"Upper room" is derived from the Gospel of Mark and the Gospel of Luke, which both employ the Koine Greek:  (Mark 14:15 and Luke 22:12), whereas the Acts of the Apostles uses the Koine Greek  (Acts 1:13), both with the meaning "upper room".

Overview

The Cenacle is considered the site where many other events described in the New Testament took place, such as:
 preparation for the celebration of Jesus's final Passover meal
 the washing of his disciples' feet
 certain resurrection appearances of Jesus
 the gathering of the disciples after the Ascension of Jesus
 the election of Saint Matthias as apostle
 the descent of the Holy Spirit upon the disciples on the day of Pentecost.

Pilgrims to Jerusalem report visiting a structure on Mount Zion commemorating the Last Supper since the 4th century AD. Some scholars would have it that this was the Cenacle, in fact a synagogue from an earlier time. The anonymous pilgrim from Bordeaux, France reported seeing such a synagogue in 333 AD. A Christian synagogue is mentioned in the apocryphal 4th-century  ("Report of Pilate"); although the depiction is fantastic and of questionable reliability (the report claims that all of the other synagogues were destroyed by divine wrath immediately after Jesus's death, which is clearly false), a Jewish origin for the building has come under serious question. The building has experienced numerous cycles of destruction and reconstruction, culminating in the Gothic structure which stands today.

While the term Cenacle refers only to the Upper Room, a niche located on the lower level of the same building is associated by tradition with the burial site of King David, marked by a large cenotaph-sarcophagus first reported seen by 12th-century Crusaders but earlier mentioned in the 10th-century . Most accept the notice in 1 Kings 2:10 that says David was buried "in the City of David", identified as the Eastern hill of ancient Jerusalem, as opposed to what is today called Mount Sion, the Western hill of the ancient city. The general location of the Cenacle is also associated with that of the house where the Virgin Mary lived among the apostles until her death or dormition, an event celebrated in the nearby Church of the Dormition.

In Christian tradition, the room was not only the site of the Last Supper, i.e., the Cenacle, but the room in which the Holy Spirit alighted upon the twelve  apostles and other believers gathered and praying together  on Pentecost. Acts 1 - 2 tell us that Judas had been replaced by Matthias, and 120 followers of Jesus gathered in this room after His ascension.

It is sometimes thought to be the place where the apostles stayed in Jerusalem. The language in Acts of the Apostles suggests that the apostles used the room as a temporary residence (Koine Greek:), although the Jamieson-Fausset-Brown Bible Commentary disagrees, preferring to see the room as a place where they were "not lodged, but had for their meeting place".

History

The early history of the Cenacle site is uncertain; scholars have attempted to establish a chronology based on archaeological, artistic and historical sources.

Based on the survey conducted by Jacob Pinkerfeld in 1948, Pixner believes that the original building was a synagogue later probably used by Jewish Christians. However, no architectural features associated with early synagogues such as columns, benches, or other accoutrements are present in the lower Tomb chamber. According to Epiphanius, bishop of Salamis writing towards the end of the 4th century, the building and its environs were spared during the destruction of Jerusalem under Titus (70 AD). Pixner suggests that the Mount Zion site was destroyed and rebuilt in the later first century. The lowest courses of ashlars (building stones) along the north, east and south walls are attributed by Pinkerfeld to the late Roman period (135-325 AD). Pixner believes  that they are Herodian-period ashlars, dating the construction of the building to an earlier period.

Many scholars, however, date the walls' earliest construction to the Byzantine period and identify the Cenacle as the remains of a no-longer-extant Hagia Sion ("Holy Zion") basilica. The Roman emperor Theodosius I constructed the five-aisled Hagia Sion basilica likely between 379 and 381 AD.

6th-century artistic representations, such as the mosaics found in Madaba, Jordan (the "Madaba Map") and the Basilica of Santa Maria Maggiore in Rome, depict a smaller structure to the south of basilica. Some have identified this smaller structure as the Cenacle thus demonstrating its independence from, and possible prior existence to, the basilica. The basilica (and possibly the Cenacle) was later damaged by Persian invaders in 614 AD but restored by the patriarch Modestus. In 1009 AD, the church was destroyed by the Muslim caliph Al-Hakim. Shortly afterward, it was replaced by the Crusaders with a cathedral named for Saint Mary, featuring a central nave and two side aisles. The Cenacle was either repaired or enclosed by the Crusader church, occupying a portion of two aisles on the right (southern) side of the altar. The Crusader cathedral was destroyed soon afterward, in the late 12th or early 13th century, but the Cenacle remained. (Today, part of the site upon which the Byzantine and Crusader churches stood is believed to be occupied by the smaller Church of the Dormition and its associated Abbey.)

Syrian Christians maintained the Cenacle until the 1330s, when it passed into the custody of the Franciscan Order of Friars who managed the structure until 1524. The Franciscans were evicted from their surrounding buildings in 1550. Architectural evidence remains of the period of Muslim control including the elaborate mihrab in the Last Supper room, the Arabic inscriptions on its walls, the qubba over the stairwell, and the minaret and dome atop the roof. Christians were not allowed to return until the establishment of the State of Israel in 1948. The historical building is currently managed by the Israeli Ministry of the Interior.

Architecture

Scholars offer wide-ranging dates and builders for the surviving Gothic-style Cenacle. Some believe that it was constructed by Crusaders just before Saladin's conquest of Jerusalem in 1187, while others attribute it to Holy Roman Emperor Frederick II, after he arrived in the city in 1229. Still others hold that it was not built in this form until the Franciscans acquired the site in the 1330s. Scarce documentation and disturbed structural features offer little strong support for any of these dates.

Archaeology
The primary early modern assessments of the Cenacle were recorded by French archaeologists. The first detailed assessment was by Eugène-Melchior de Vogüé in 1860. This was largely followed by other commentators until the work of Camille Enlart and Louis-Hugues Vincent / Félix-Marie Abel.

Capitals and columns
In its current state, the Cenacle is divided into six rib-vaulted bays. The bays are supported by three freestanding columns which bilaterally divide the space, as well as six pillars flanking the side walls. While the capital of the westernmost freestanding column is flush with the Cenacle's interior wall, the column shaft itself is completely independent of the wall, leading scholars to consider the possibility that this wall was not original to the building.

An analysis of the column and pillar capitals offers clues, but not a solution, to the mystery of the current building's origin.  The Corinthianesque capital between the second and third bays of the Cenacle is stylistically indicative of multiple geographical regions and chronological periods. This capital's spiky leaves, which tightly adhere to the volume of the column before erupting into scrolls, are in congruence with common outputs of the 12th-century sculpture workshop at the Temple site in Jerusalem in the last years before Saladin's conquest in 1187. The workshop also frequently utilized drilling as an ornamental device.   The Jerusalem workshop included artists from diverse regions in the West, who brought stylistic traits with them from their native countries. The workshop produced sculpture for many Crusader projects and other structures, such as the al-Aqsa mosque.

This comparison allows for the support of the 12th century date of the Cenacle. There are also, however, similar capitals which originated in workshops in southern Italy, a draw for scholars who wish to associate the building with Holy Roman Emperor Frederick II and the Sixth Crusade in 1229. Examples can be seen in the Romanesque cathedral in Bitonto, a small city near Bari, in southern Italy, and on column supports of the pulpit in the Pisa Baptistery, carved by Apulian-born sculptor Nicola Pisano around 1260.

The capitals of the freestanding columns are not identical. The capital between the first and second bays seems either severely weathered or shallowly carved, and its volume is a marked contrast from the others. It rises from the shaft in a straight cylinder, rather than in an inverted pyramid, and then flares only just before it intersects with the abacus. The third capital, which now flanks the Cenacle's western wall, is also unique among the three. It is not decorated with a floral motif, rather, scrolling crockets spring from the base of the volume. Enlart has proposed a comparison to buildings constructed by Frederick II in Apulia.

Analysis of these column capitals does not yield significant evidence to link them to the 14th century and a potential Franciscan construction, nor does it definitively date them to the 12th or 13th century. The building remains a frustrating, but intriguing, mystery.

References in hymns
The upper room is a focus of reference in several Christian hymns, for example in "An upper room did our Lord prepare", written by Fred Pratt Green in 1973, and in "Come, risen Lord, and deign to be our guest" ('We meet, as in that upper room they met...'), written by George Wallace Briggs.

Other sites
St. Mark’s Monastery in the Old City of Jerusalem near the Armenian Quarter is sometime considered as alternative place for the Cenacle. The monastery church, belonging to the Syriac Orthodox Church, contains an early Christian stone inscription testifying to reverence for the spot.

See also
 Church of Zion, Jerusalem or Church of the Apostles on Mount Zion, Roman-era church or synagogue speculated to have belonged to an early Jewish-Christian congregation

References

Further reading
 Pierotti, Ermete, 1864, Jerusalem explored: being a description of the ancient and modern city, with numerous illustrations consisting of views, ground plans, and sections

External links

 "Church of the Apostles found on Mt. Zion" – article from the May/June 1990 issue of Biblical Archaeological Review
 The Judeo-Christian Synagogue and the Tomb of David
 The Development of the Judeo-Christian Synagogue

Christianity in Jerusalem
Shrines in Jerusalem
Churches in Jerusalem
Gothic architecture in Israel
New Testament places
1st-century Christianity
Relics associated with Jesus
Christian pilgrimages
Mount Zion
Last Supper